Route 855 is a  long mostly north–south secondary highway in the southwestern portion of New Brunswick, Canada.

Route description
Most of the route is in Kings County.

The route's northern terminus is north of Midland at Route 124, where it travels south through Midland.  The route then travels through a heavily wooded area past Dickie Mountain and ends at Route 121 north of Bloomfield.

History

See also

References

855
855